Potentilla newberryi is a species of cinquefoil known by the common name Newberry's cinquefoil. It is native to the Pacific Northwest of the United States from Washington to the northeastern Modoc Plateau in California and Nevada.

Distribution
It grows in moist habitat, particularly drying areas such as receding vernal pools and evaporating puddles. It is a dominant plant in many kinds of local habitat, such as sagebrush and juniper woodlands.

Description
The Potentilla newberryi plant may be annual or perennial. It grows from a taproot and produces a basal rosette of leaves. The hairy leaves are made up of a few overlapping pairs of deeply lobed leaflets.

The inflorescence is a cyme of several flowers, each with usually five white petals a few millimeters long.

References

External links
Jepson Manual eFlora (TJM2) treatment of Potentilla newberryi
UC CalPhotos gallery of Potentilla newberryi

newberryi
Flora of California
Flora of Nevada
Flora of Oregon
Flora of Washington (state)
Flora of the Great Basin
Endemic flora of the United States
Taxa named by Asa Gray
Flora without expected TNC conservation status